Heerema Marine Contractors (HMC) is a contractor headquartered in the Netherlands most notable for operation of three of the largest crane vessels in the offshore industry.

History
Heerema Marine Contractors was formed in 1948 by Pieter Schelte Heerema as a small construction company providing oilfield platforms in Venezuela.

In the 1960s the company focused on the North Sea offshore developments. The company developed crane vessels to lift large offshore platforms and modules. The ship shaped crane vessel Challenger was equipped to lift 800 t.

The need for large stable crane vessels to operate in the North Sea environment lead the company to develop the first large semi-submersible crane vessels. In 1978, HMC commissioned Mitsui to construct the two sister semi-submersible crane vessels,  and SSCV Hermod. These vessels could lift 5,400 tonnes with the twin cranes, and were later upgraded to 8,200 tonnes.

In 1988 HMC formed a joint venture with McDermott called HeereMac.

The  was added to the HeereMac fleet, and upon the split of the companies in December 1997, Heerema took ownership of the Thialf, the largest deep water construction vessel and is capable of a tandem lift of 14,200 t (15,600 short tons)

The  was affected by a flooding incident in 2006 and was put out of service for a few months.

Since 2022 the company is led by CEO Philippe Barril.

Vessels
Heerema presently owns and operates the following crane vessels:

 - Decommissioned late 2017

Kolga tug
Bylgia tug

Plus a number of barges.

Significant installations
 Bullwinkle
 Perdido
 Thunder Horse PDQ
 Peregrino
 Kaombo

References

External links
Heerema's vessel location map

Engineering companies of the Netherlands
Offshore engineering
Oilfield services companies
Oil companies of the Netherlands
Construction and civil engineering companies established in 1948
Non-renewable resource companies established in 1948
1948 establishments in the Netherlands